Entulang may refer to:

 Entulang, a local or variety name of tree species Durio graveolens
 Entulang junction on Malaysia Federal Route 1 (Sarawak)
 Kampung Entulang Bungkang, a junction on Jalan Sri Aman, Malaysia
 Nanga Entulang, a settlement in the Sri Aman District of Sarawak, Malaysia
 , a school in Sarawak, Malaysia
 , stream in Sarawak, Malaysia
 , different river in  Sarawak, Malaysia